The 2014 Vorarlberg state election was held on 21 September 2014 to elect the members of the Landtag of Vorarlberg.

The Austrian People's Party (ÖVP) suffered substantial losses, and was deprived of its majority in the Landtag. The second-placed Freedom Party of Austria (FPÖ) and Social Democratic Party of Austria (SPÖ) retained their position with minor losses. The beneficiaries of the ÖVP's defeat were The Greens, who achieved a breakthrough result of 17.1%, and NEOS – The New Austria, which debuted at 6.9%.

Now lacking a majority, the ÖVP led by Governor Markus Wallner sought a coalition partner. They ultimately formed government with the Greens.

Background
In the 2009 election, the ÖVP saw a small downswing but retained its majority. The FPÖ double its share of the vote and became the second largest party, ahead of the SPÖ.

Electoral system
The 36 seats of the Landtag of Vorarlberg are elected via open list proportional representation in a two-step process. The seats are distributed between four multi-member constituencies, corresponding to the districts of Vorarlberg. For parties to receive any representation in the Landtag, they must either win at least one seat in a constituency directly, or clear a 5 percent state-wide electoral threshold. Seats are distributed in constituencies according to the Hagenbach-Bischoff quota, with any remaining seats allocated at the state level, to ensure overall proportionality between a party's vote share and its share of seats.

Contesting parties
The table below lists parties represented in the previous Landtag.

In addition to the parties already represented in the Landtag, five parties collected enough signatures to be placed on the ballot.

 NEOS – The New Austria (NEOS)
 WIR – Platform for Families and Child Protection (WIR)
 Christian Party of Austria (CPÖ)
 Pirate Party of Austria (PIRAT)
 Men's Party (M)

Result

Results by constituency

References

2014 in Austria